EV100, EV-100 or EV100 may refer to:
 The EV-100 serotype of the enterovirus
 EV100 - exposure value for ISO 100 film speed
 EV100 - an electric car produced by the Chinese company JMEV

See also 
 EV (disambiguation)